Saints and Soldiers: Airborne Creed is a 2012 war drama film directed by Ryan Little and produced by Little and Adam Abel. It is based on events that took place during the invasion of Southern France in World War II. The film stars Corbin Allred, David Nibley, and Jasen Wade. The film's story has no relation to the events or characters portrayed in the 2003 war film Saints and Soldiers. The film was shot in Utah, on a tight budget, saving money by using volunteer World War II reenactors as some of the actors and extras. The film received mixed reviews; many critics found the film mediocre, yet still praised the performances and cinematography.  This film precedes the third film in the series, Saints and Soldiers: The Void, which was released in 2014.

Plot
In August 1944, the Allies have invaded German-occupied Southern France. German Army Second Lieutenant Erich Neumann (Lincoln Hoppe) executes two French men. On the early morning of August 15, paratroopers from the 517th Parachute Regimental Combat Team land in Provence, France, under heavy fire from the Germans. Two soldiers, Corporals Harland 'Bud' Curtis (Jasen Wade) and James Rossi (Corbin Allred), land separately. Curtis is spotted by a German Patrol and quickly surrenders. After throwing a grenade to distract the Germans, Rossi kills the entire patrol and rescues Curtis. The two set off towards their intended landing area before finding an abandoned shelter where they are followed by Curtis's squad leader Sergeant Caleb Jones (David Nibley). MISTAKE: The Sergeant states he is from Bravo company, but there was no Bravo company until after Korea. It was called Baker company. The three travel through the French country as quickly as possible to avoid being pursued. They encounter Neumann and kill his troops, but spare him.

The three soldiers continue making their way to Les Arcs and agree to help French Resistance prisoners escape. They free the resistance prisoners: Philippe, Gustave and Jacques. The group arrives at Les Arcs, and Jones spots a German Panzer III and a Sd.Kfz. 251 half-track full of German infantry enroute to attack the rest of the paratroopers. The three attempt to ambush the Germans, but are badly wounded. After Curtis's death, Rossi regains consciousness and is approached by Neumann, whom Jones spared earlier. Rossi gets up to fight but collapses due to his wounds. Neumann, also wounded, does not kill him, showing him the same mercy that Jones' showed him.

He takes Rossi to an abandoned farm, where he bandages his wounds and makes him a meal. The following morning, an American detachment discovers Rossi, alive, and Neumann, who has died from his wound. In a military field hospital Rossi is informed that sergeant Jones is alive but wounded and Curtis is dead. The dead Neumann remains in the abandoned farm.

Cast
 Corbin Allred as Corporal James Rossi
 David Nibley as Sergeant Caleb Jones
 Jasen Wade as Corporal Harland "Bud" Curtis
 Lincoln Hoppe as Captain Erich Neumann 
 Nichelle Aiden as Charlotte
 Virginie Fourtina Anderson as Emilie
 Loïc Anthian as Phillipe 
 Lance Otto as Jacques
 Erich Cannon as Gustave
 Curt Doussett as Lt. Woodward
 Calvin Harrison as Pvt. Stewart

Production
The director of Saints and Soldiers, Ryan Little, struggled with his producer, Adam Abel, to create a sequel to the film, because nearly all of his main characters died in the first film. However, due to the popularity of the first film, they decided to do a sequel. The film was originally titled "Foxhole". The film was based on the events surrounding the 517th Parachute Infantry Regiment, part of Operation Dragoon, which occurred two months after D-Day. Specifically, it was inspired by the true stories from L. Vaughn Curtis's book Letters Home: A Paratrooper's Story, based on the experience and letters of Curtis's father Harland "Bud" Curtis. They also adapted it from Little's short film The Last Good War, for which Little won a student Emmy award. Corbin Allred was also cast in this film, but as a different character from the original. The film was shot in Utah on a tight budget and used volunteer World War II reenactors as many of the actors and extras.

Release and reception
Saints and Soldiers: Airborne Creed, was released on August 17, 2012. The film received mixed reviews. The Evening Standard 's review described the film as "watchable but hardly memorable", while The Guardian'''s critic Peter Bradshaw wrote the film was "well-acted" and "competently put together" but with "plenty of cliches", describing it as "a kind of diet or lite version of Steven Spielberg's Saving Private Ryan." Deseret News stated that Airborne Creed is "less believable" than its predecessor. For example, scenes appear "staged" and "quickly thrown together". However, they praise the acting. KSL'' news stated that the film falls short of the original but is still, "packed with emotion and solid performances" and "beautiful cinematography".

See also

 Cinema of the United States
 List of American films of 2012
 List of World War II films

Further reading

References

External links
 
 
 

2012 films
Films set in 1944
War epic films
American war films
Mormon cinema
Films about the United States Army
Films shot in Utah
Saints and Soldiers films
Films set in France
Western Front of World War II films
Harold B. Lee Library-related 21st century articles
World War II films based on actual events
2010s English-language films
Films directed by Ryan Little
2010s American films